This is a summary of the electoral history of Jo Swinson, the Leader of the Liberal Democrats from 22 July 2019 to 13 December 2019, and a Member of the United Kingdom Parliament from 2005 to 2019, when she lost her seat as MP for East Dunbartonshire in the 2019 General Election and, due to party rules, stepped down from her position as Leader of the Liberal Democrats.

UK Parliament elections

2005 general election

2010 general election

2015 general election

2017 general election

2019 general election

Party elections

2017 Liberal Democrats deputy leadership election
Following the close of nominations, only Swinson was officially nominated, and was elected unopposed.

2019 Liberal Democrats leadership election

The electorate numbered 106,075, meaning that 76,429 Liberal Democrat members cast a vote, and 29,646 did not.

References

Jo Swinson
Swinson, Jo
Swinson, Jo